Makkabi Helsinki is a Finnish Jewish sports club in Helsinki, Finland. It is the oldest Jewish sports club in the world that has an uninterrupted history. It was founded in 1906 with the name “Stjärnan”' (Swedish for ‘the star’). The current name was adopted in 1936.

In association football, the club played in the top-flight competition Mestaruussarja in 1930, after that on lower levels. These days the main sports are bowling, futsal, basketball and floorball. The club celebrated its centennial in November, 2006.

The president of the club, Dennis Mattsoff, has mentioned Elias Katz as the most celebrated athlete to have represented this club. Katz won gold in the 1924 Olympic Games in Paris with Paavo Nurmi and Ville Ritola in the 3000m team race. He also won a silver medal in the 3000 meter steeple chase race.

According to Mattsoff, the objective of the club is to strengthen the Jewish identity of the community in Helsinki, and to help the youngsters acquire also values other than those relating to competitive sports.

The club had its worst setback in history at the Helsinki Olympic Stadium on 21 June 1938, when its athlete Abraham Tokazier participated in a 100 metre race. He was officially declared to have come fourth, but on the basis of photographs and other pieces contemporary of evidence, it has been surmised that in reality he won the race. A possible reason for foul play on the part of the organisers was the fact that among the spectators there was a delegation from Nazi Germany.

Season to season

References

External links
 http://www.rsssf.com/miscellaneous/jewish-ww.html#Finland
 https://web.archive.org/web/20070928031726/http://www.maccabiworld.org/ntext.asp?psn=8009
 https://web.archive.org/web/20090312012054/http://www.jchelsinki.fi/yhdistykset/makkabi.htm

Sports teams in Finland
Jews and Judaism in Finland
Sports clubs in Helsinki
Helsinki